GoRaleigh is the transit system responsible for operating most of the public transportation services in Raleigh, North Carolina. The system operates 27 fixed routes throughout the city's municipal area and also operates five regional/express routes in partnership with GoTriangle, the regional provider. GoRaleigh is contracted to operate two additional routes, an express route to the Wake Tech Community College campus south of Raleigh and a local circulator service in the Town of Wake Forest. Capital Area Transit, also known as CAT, was rebranded to GoRaleigh in 2015 under the consolidated GoTransit, a joint branding of municipal and regional transit systems for the Research Triangle.

History

Early days 

In 1891, the mule-drawn service came to an end, and the electric streetcar service began. Due to rapid advances in automotive technology at that time, in 1933 all electric streetcar services ended, replaced by gasoline-powered buses. Ridership remained strong until the 1950s, when the popularity of private vehicles began to reduce transit ridership nationwide.

 1881–1894 – Raleigh Street Railway
 1894–1908 – Raleigh Electric Co.
 1908–1921 – Carolina Power & Light Co.
 1921–1925 – Carolina Power & Light Co. (Electric Bond & Shares Co.)
 1925–1946 – Carolina Power & Light Co. (National Power & Light Co.), operating from 126 N. West Street, Raleigh
 1930s – streetcars discontinued
 1946–1950 – Carolina Power & Light Company (CP&L).
 1950–1958 – White Transportation Co.
 1958–1975 – Raleigh City Coach Lines (City Coach Lines, Inc.)
 1975–2015 – City of Raleigh/Capital Area Transit
 2015–present – City of Raleigh/GoRaleigh

In the mid- to late 20th century, CP&L ended its operation of transit services in the city, and the current publicly owned Capital Area Transit system was created.  Capital Area Transit formerly rebranded its system to GoRaleigh in 2015.

Current system

Layout 
GoRaleigh provides public transportation to areas known colloquially as inside the beltline and outside I-440, as well as contracted service to the Town of Wake Forest and to Wake Tech Community College.  The system operates on a hub and spoke-style layout, with most routes beginning and ending at the newly renovated GoRaleigh Station, formerly known as Moore Square Station, in downtown Raleigh.  The "L" routes circulate through an area or operate as a cross-town route and link with one or more "spoke" routes.  The "X" routes are express routes which operate non-stop or with limited stops along the body of the route.  Stops on these routes are generally available only at the beginning and end points of the route.  Longer distance routes are operated by the intercounty GoTriangle system.

GoRaleigh publicly posts its General Transit Feed Specification (GTFS) data so riders can easily plan their trips using services such as Google Transit in Google Maps.  GoRaleigh also supports the Transloc Rider App that offers real-time bus location through its GPS equipped fleet.

The R-Line 
See main article R-Line (Capital Area Transit).

The R-Line began service on February 13, 2009. The route is served by three specially designed hybrid-electric buses, powered by bio-diesel fuel. The buses, operating along a route resembling an inverted U, stop at 25 specially designed bus-stops throughout downtown Raleigh. Service frequency is every 15 minutes. In order to maximize frequency two buses operate on the circulator route at all times, while one bus serves as back-up in the event of mechanical failure.  The R-Line is a free circulator service.

GoRaleigh Station 
Renovations to GoRaleigh Station, formerly known as Moore Square Station, were completed May, 2017.  What was once a cavernous tunnel that lacked informational signs was transformed into a spacious terminal with additional seating and LCD monitors that provide real time bus arrival information.  The station is accessible to pedestrians from Blount Street, Hargett Street, Wilmington Street or Martin Street and features a centrally located information and ticket booth staffed by GoRaleigh employees.

The bus station was re-designed to accommodate more buses and more riders as a result of the Wake Transit Plan, which county voters approved in 2016. The station currently serves 35 bus routes per day and nearly 80 buses per hour during peak hours.  The station is designed to support up to 150 buses per hour once the Wake County Transit Plan  is fully implemented.

Routes

Current Routes 
This list refers to all existing GoRaleigh routes in service as of March 2023. Refer to GoRaleigh for more info.

Future

Five-year plan 

In 2002, Capital Area Transit (CAT) spent $200,000 to hire consultants to come up with a five-year plan to improve public transit in Raleigh.  At that time, most bus schedules were ten years out of date.  It wasn't until fiscal year 2006 that the city council gave CAT the additional funding needed to begin implementing year one of a five-year plan.  At the start of the fiscal year 2007, Raleigh City Council gave CAT the additional funding needed for year two of the five-year plan (which took effect on bus routes in January, 2007).

Despite the city budget providing CAT with additional funding for year three of the five-year plan for the fiscal year 2008 (July 2007-June 2008) and additional funding for year four of the five-year plan for the last quarter of the fiscal year 2009, these changes were never implemented because tax revenues had been lower than expected and the funds were not available.

The city budget for the fiscal year 2010 notes that "The FY 2010 budget represents the implementation of delayed transit services from last year... year three of the Transit Plan will begin January 2010 and will result in reduced headways on Route 15 Wake Med, a new route in Southeast Raleigh, and a series of other small service changes." However, the implementation of these changes continues to be delayed due to budget shortfalls.

Additionally, $7.6 million of stimulus money has been awarded to CAT towards the garage. In May 2011, the new facility was opened.

On August 6, 2017, GoRaleigh expanded its Sunday service as described in the first round improvements of the Wake County Transit Plan .

Bus Rapid Transit 

The Wake County Transit Plan includes the future implementation of Bus Rapid Transit (BRT) routes sometime between 2018 and 2023.  BRT involves building dedicated bus lanes on local roads, so bus operators can bypass traffic and keep their routes on schedule. To implement BRT for the first time in Wake County, the plan will construct approximately 20 miles of BRT-related infrastructure improvements.  About 20 miles of BRT infrastructure have been identified including New Bern Avenue between Raleigh Boulevard and WakeMed; Capital Boulevard between Peace Street and the Wake Forest Road intersection; South Wilmington Street towards Garner; and Western Boulevard between Raleigh and Cary.  Along these corridors, buses would have priority treatment at traffic signals, BRT stops will feature raised platforms, making it easier for passengers with wheelchairs, strollers or bicycles to board the bus.

Funding 

For FY 2010, CAT's operating budget was $15,439,636, a 1% decrease from the previous fiscal year's budget of $15,596,444. This ended a four-year streak in which CAT had seen an increase in funding to meet the demands of the five-year plan. Of CAT's budget, $10,369,966 is from the city, with additional funding coming from the state, passenger revenue (estimated farebox revenue for FY 2010 is $2,480,623, but it is unclear whether this includes bus pass sales or GoPass contracts, as in past city budgets this was separated), and miscellaneous sources (such as grants and advertising).

Ridership 

According to the Raleigh City budget for the fiscal year 2010, ridership levels averaged over 14,000 each business day, up from 13,000 for the fiscal year of 2008, 11,000 in 2005 (when gas prices began to climb after Hurricane Katrina), and 8,000 in 2002.

Other transit services in Raleigh

GoRaleigh Access 
GoRaleigh Access, formerly Accessible Raleigh Transportation (ART), is the City of Raleigh's transportation service for people with disabilities. GoRaleigh Access programs help ensure an outstanding quality of life for everyone in the City of Raleigh. GoRaleigh Access enables eligible persons to access public transportation.  GoRaleigh Access trips are eligible for paratransit service only if the trip begins and ends within 3/4 miles of a GoRaleigh bus stop.

GoTriangle 

GoTriangle (formerly Triangle Transit or the Triangle Transit Authority), is a regional transit service that connects Raleigh with neighboring cities, suburbs, Raleigh-Durham International Airport and Research Triangle Park. GoTriangle also organizes a vanpool program serving the Research Triangle metropolitan region.

Wolfline 

The Wolfline operates nearly a dozen routes that serve the NCSU (North Carolina State University) community and surrounding areas in west Raleigh. In addition to serving NCSU students, faculty and staff, the Wolfline system is available for use by the general public.

Pepsi Caniac Coach 
The Pepsi Caniac Coach are shuttles that provide transportation between Downtown Raleigh and North Hills restaurants to the PNC Arena on Carolina Hurricanes gamedays and other events at the arena. The two routes started in 2013 due to a lack of public transit to the arena. The service is free for diners who purchase Pepsi-branded beverages at participating restaurants.

Long distance transit services 
The city of Raleigh is also served by Amtrak by train, Raleigh-Durham International Airport by air and Greyhound by bus.

References

External links 

Official webpage
Information on City of Raleigh website
City of Raleigh official website
National Park Service 
Transit 5-year plan 

Bus transportation in North Carolina
Transportation in Raleigh, North Carolina